Ostorij (also Romanized as Ostorīj; also known as Esterīch, Maḩalleh-ye Osrīj, and Osţorīch) is a village in Sakhvid Rural District, Nir District, Taft County, Yazd Province, Iran. At the 2006 census, its population was 47, in 21 families.

References 

Populated places in Taft County